Frederico Gil was the defending champion, but decided to compete in the Aegon International instead.

Albert Ramos won the title, defeating Evgeny Korolev in the final after Korolev retired due to fatigue with Ramos leading 6–4, 3–0.

Seeds

Draw

Finals

Top half

Bottom half

References
 Main Draw
 Qualifying Draw

Aspria Tennis Cup Trofeo City Life - Singles
Aspria Tennis Cup